The Petrom Brazi Power Station is one of the largest electricity producers in Romania, having 2 natural gas-fired groups of 430 MW  each, totalling an installed capacity of 860 MW and an electricity generation capacity of around 6 TWh/year.

The power plant is situated in Prahova County (southern Romania) near Petrom's refinery in Brazi. The construction of the power plant began in 2009 and was completed in 2011 at a total cost of 530 million Euros.

References

Natural gas-fired power stations in Romania

no:Brazi gasskraftverk